Detox is Treble Charger's fifth studio album, released in August 2002. The album was certified Gold in Canada. Detox was also nominated for "Rock Album of the Year" at the 2003 Juno Awards.

Track listing
All songs written by Treble Charger.

"Hundred Million" – 2:54
"What You Want" – 2:54
"Can't Wake Up" – 2:48
"The First Time" – 3:10
"Ideal Waste of Time" – 3:11
"Hole in Your Head" – 2:48
"Don't Believe It All" – 4:20
"Over My Head" – 3:18
"Tired of It Anyway" – 3:05
"The Downward Dance" – 2:49
"Drive" – 7:19

Credits
Treble Charger
Greig Nori      -  Guitar, Vocals
Bill Priddle    -  Guitar, Vocals
Rosie Martin    -  Bass
Trevor McGregor -  Drums
Sum 41
Deryck Whibley   -  Vocals, Guitar, Co-Producer
Steve Jocz - Drums
Matt Hyde        -	 Producer, Engineer, Mixing
Zach Blakestone      -  Assistant
Ben Cook             -  Vocals
Dan Druff            -  Guitar Technician
Paul Forgues         -  Engineer, Digital Editing, Assistant
Greg Kolchinsky      -  Assistant Engineer
Ed Krautner          -  Engineer, Digital Editing
Tom Lord-Alge        -  Mixing
Dave Ogilvie         -  Mixing
Jon Sawyer       -  Drawing

Charts

Year-end charts

References

Treble Charger albums
2002 albums
ViK. Recordings albums